Filippo d'Angeli (1600–1660) was an Italian painter  of the Baroque period, active mainly in Florence and Naples, painting battles scenes with small figures. Also known as il Napoletano. Born in Rome.

References

Painters from Rome
1600 births
1660 deaths
17th-century Italian painters
Italian male painters
Italian Baroque painters
Italian battle painters